Kot Hara (Urdu: کوٹ ہرا , Punjabi: ہرے دا کوٹ), also known as "Haray Da Kot" is a village in Gujranwala District located on Pindi Bhattian road. It is centered at the intersection of Mandi Bahaudin Road and Wazirabad Road. Much of the occupants are Jatt Chatthas. Fish Farms are present in the vicinity of the village as well as local lands. It was a crossroads of local trade in the era of the British Raj. The two major cities in its surroundings (Rasoolnagar, Alipur Chattha) are popular local markets or "Mandis" where the local residents sell their goods from time to time. About 10 km north west of the village lies the Qadirabad Headworks which supplies water to the canals surrounding the village. The village has a Government Primary and Middle School which benefits students from nearby Madrassa Chattha also.

Villages in Gujranwala District
Union councils of Wazirabad Tehsil